Alley of Stars may refer to:

Alley of Stars of Kazakhstan, Almaty
 , Opole, Poland
 Alley of Tatar Stars, Kazan, Russia

See also
Hollywood Walk of Fame, the first venue with stars for "stars"
Star Square (Moscow)
Birmingham Walk of Stars

ru:Аллея звёзд